Lorenzo Quintana Fernández (born March 1, 1989) is a Cuban professional baseball catcher and first baseman who is a free agent. He is a member of the Cuban national baseball team in the 2023 World Baseball Classic.

Career
Quintana played in the Cuban National Series from 2008 to 2015 with Pinar del Río.

Houston Astros
On October 4, 2017, Quintana signed with the Houston Astros as an international free agent. He made his organizational debut in 2018 with the Double-A Corpus Christi Hooks, appearing in 70 games and hitting .254/.316/.484 with 11 home runs and 42 RBI. The next year, Quintana played in 76 games split between Corpus Christi and the Triple-A Round Rock Express, slashing .299/.342/.547 with 17 home runs and 56 RBI.

Quintana did not play in a game in 2020 due to the cancellation of the minor league season because of the COVID-19 pandemic. In 2021, he played in 28 games for the Triple-A Sugar Land Skeeters, hitting .311/.372/.340 with no home runs and 4 RBI.

Miami Marlins
On June 13, 2021, Quintana was traded to the Miami Marlins. He finished out the year playing in 64 games for the Triple-A Jacksonville Jumbo Shrimp, hitting .294/.354/.525 with 9 home runs and 34 RBI.

In 2022, Quintana played in 60 games for Triple-A Jacksonville, batting .246/.306/.479 with 14 home runs and 54 RBI. He was released by the Marlins organization on August 3, 2022.

References

External links

1989 births
Living people
Vegueros de Pinar del Rio players
Corpus Christi Hooks players
Cangrejeros de Santurce (baseball) players
Round Rock Express players
Cañeros de Los Mochis players
Sugar Land Skeeters players
Jacksonville Jumbo Shrimp players
Florida Complex League Marlins players
Tigres del Licey players
2023 World Baseball Classic players
Cuban expatriate baseball players in Puerto Rico
Cuban expatriate baseball players in Mexico
Cuban expatriate baseball players in the Dominican Republic
Cuban expatriate baseball players in the United States